The Cameroon Davis Cup team represents Cameroon in Davis Cup tennis competition and are governed by the Fédération Camerounaise de Tennis. 
Cameroon currently compete in the Europe/Africa Zone of Group IV. Their best result was reaching the African Group II semifinals in 1989.

History
Cameroon competed in its first Davis Cup in 1988. They have not competed since 2000, but are entered in the 2009 competition.

Current team (2022) 

 Etienne Teboh
 Lloyd Sergio Watat Njanga
 Boriss Kamdem
 Okala Hagoua Valentin Brayan Alexis
 Cliford Wuyum Nkwain

See also
Davis Cup
Cameroon Fed Cup team

External links

Davis Cup teams
Davis Cup
Davis Cup